Kamlak is a rural locality (a selo) and the administrative centre of Kamlakskoye Rural Settlement of Shebalinsky District, the Altai Republic, Russia. The population was 572 as of 2016. There are 7 streets.

Geography 
Kamlak is located at the confluence of the Kamlak River in Sema River, 46 km north of Shebalino (the district's administrative centre) by road. Ust-Sema is the nearest rural locality.

References 

Rural localities in Shebalinsky District